Robyn Hitchcock is the twenty-first studio album by British musician Robyn Hitchcock. It was released in 2017 through Yep Roc. The album, largely rooted in psychedelic rock, represents a stylistic change from his previous LP, The Man Upstairs, which was entirely acoustic.

Reception
The album received generally positive reviews. Jon Young, writing for Paste Magazine, noted that the album "feels familiar and utterly fresh at once", also being "a perfect summation of the artist, as the title suggests". AllMusic reviewer James Christopher Monger called it "easily his most vibrant collection of new music since the early 1990s".

Track listing
All compositions by Robyn Hitchcock.
"I Want to Tell You About What I Want"
"Virginia Woolf"
"I Pray When I'm Drunk"
"Mad Shelley's Letterbox"
"Sayonara Judge"
"Detective Mindhorn"
"1970 in Aspic"
"Raymond and the Wires"
"Autumn Sunglasses"
"Time Coast"

Personnel
Robyn Hitchcock – guitar, vocals
Anne McCue – guitar
Jon Estes – bass
Jon Radford – drums
Pat Sansone – vocal
Grant Lee Phillips – vocals
Emma Swift – vocals
Gillian Welch – vocals

References

2017 albums
Robyn Hitchcock albums
Yep Roc Records albums